Valea Mănăstirii may refer to several villages in Romania:

 Valea Mănăstirii, a village in Râmeț Commune, Alba County
 Valea Mănăstirii, a village in Țițești Commune, Argeș County
 Valea Mănăstirii, a village in Cătunele Commune, Gorj County